Selman Sevinç (born 12 April 1995 in Venlo) is a professional footballer who plays as a midfielder for Turkish club Darıca Gençlerbirliği. Born in the Netherlands, he elected to represent Turkey at youth international level.

Career
In July 2016, he joined Osmanlıspor.

On 31 January 2019, Sevinç joined German club SV Straelen on a contract for the rest of the season.

On 24 July 2019, Sevinç joined Darıca Gençlerbirliği in the Turkish third division.

References

External links
 Voetbal International profile 
 
 Selman Sevinç at FuPa

1995 births
Living people
Dutch footballers
Dutch expatriate footballers
Dutch people of Turkish descent
VVV-Venlo players
Ankaraspor footballers
Diyarbakırspor footballers
SV 19 Straelen players
Darıca Gençlerbirliği footballers
Eerste Divisie players
Regionalliga players
Süper Lig players
TFF Second League players
Footballers from Venlo
Association football midfielders
Dutch expatriate sportspeople in Germany
Expatriate footballers in Germany